Bertholds may refer to:

People
 Berthold-Bezelin, 10th-century German princes who ruled the territories of Trechirgau and Maifeldgau also known as the Bertholds

Surnames
Bertholds is a Latvian-language surname, a Latvian-spelling version of Berthold. The feminine form is Bertholde.

Viktors Bertholds, one of the last native speakers of the Livonian language
Grizelda Bertholde, maiden name of Grizelda Kristiņa, last native speaker of the Livonian language

Latvian-language masculine surnames